Mutilator was a thrash / death metal band, formed in 1985 in Belo Horizonte, Brazil. They released two full-length records through Cogumelo Records in the 1980s.

Biography
Mutilator was formed in 1985 in Belo Horizonte by vocalist/guitarist Kleber, guitarist/lyricist Alexander "Magoo", bassist Ricardo Neves and his brother Rodrigo on drums, originally under the name of Desaster. The band changed their name to Mutilator following the addition of Sepultura roadie Silvio SDN on vocals. This line-up recorded the Bloodstorm and Grave Deseccration demos, and contributed two tracks (Believers of Hell and Nuclear Holocaust) to the Cogumelo Records' compilation Warfare Noise I in 1986.

By 1987 Silvio SDN had left the band, and the band recorded their debut album for Cogumelo, Immortal Force with Kleber on vocals. The album was recorded on a tiny budget but has proved to have some long-lasting appeal; Eduardo Rivadavia of Allmusic describes it as "an excellent case study in DIY ethics and the desire to succeed against all odds" and comments, "when held up against its improbable origins, many of its deficiencies can't help but be ignored, and may well explain the album's enduring appeal in the eyes of serious metal collectors". Comparisons have been made between the album and the works of Sepultura, Sarcófago, Vulcano, Kreator, Anthrax, Slayer, Metallica, Possessed and Bathory The album however had little international impact, and led only to limited national touring. Magoo however had faith in Mutilator's future potential and turned down an offer to replace Jairo T. in Sepultura (a position  eventually taken by Andreas Kisser).

A second album, Into the Strange was released in 1988 with a different line-up, following the departure of the Neves siblings. Magoo took over on vocals, also penning all of the lyrics and much of the music; the record also saw the arrival of new members CM (on guitars) and drummer Armando Sampaio (ex-Holocausto). Recorded and mixed in 16 tracks at Belo Horizonte's JG Studios, the album "held the distinction of being Brazilian heavy metal's most professional domestic production yet". However, the album fell well short of commercial expectations, and Mutilator split up shortly after its release.

The band returned to activities from April 2018.

Line-up

Last known line-up
 Pedro Ladeira (vocals)
 Igor Podrão (guitar)
 Cesar Pessoa (guitar)
 Rodrigo Neves (drums)
 Ricardo Neves (bass)

Previous members
 Ricardo Neves (bass)
 Rodrigo Neves (drums)
 Marcelo (vocals)
 Silvio SDN (vocals)

Discography
 Bloodstorm (demo, 1986)
 Grave Desecration (demo, 1986)
 Warfare Noise I split LP (with Chakal, Holocausto and Sarcófago; Cogumelo, 1986)
 Immortal Force (Cogumelo, 1987)
 Into the Strange (Cogumelo, 1988)

References

External links
 Mutilator at Cogumelo

Musical groups established in 1985
Brazilian black metal musical groups
Brazilian thrash metal musical groups
Musical groups disestablished in 1989
1985 establishments in Brazil
1989 disestablishments in Brazil